The National Rugby League (NRL) regular season usually begins in the second week of March, finishing in the first weekend of September before the finals series. Generally, there are 192 games played over 25 rounds, with each of the 16 teams playing 24 matches each. Since 2017, the schedule has generally featured one Thursday night game (7:55pm (all times AEDT/AEST)), two Friday games (6:00pm and 7:55pm), three Saturday games (3:00pm, 5:30pm and 7:35pm) and two Sunday games (2:00pm, 4:05pm and/or 6:30pm). In addition to these regularly scheduled games, there are occasionally games at other times, such as Easter Weekend, ANZAC Day and the Queen's Birthday.

Also in place are TV agreements as to who shows these games. All matches are shown live on Fox League and the Thursday night, Friday night and Sunday afternoon (4:05pm) are simulcast with Channel 9. Channel 9 also show the Good Friday and ANZAC Day games on top of the usual matches.

Each team plays half of their matches at home and half away, playing seven teams just once and nine teams twice. Who each team plays, when and where is mainly determined on club requests as to which matchups attracts the best crowds and television ratings.

The winning team at the end of the regular season is crowned the minor premier, and has received the J. J. Giltinan Shield since 1997.

Game times 
Matches, as of 2020, are played as follows (all times AEDT/AEST)

 Thursday night: 7:55pm
 Friday evening: 6:00pm
 Friday night: 7:55pm
 Saturday afternoon: 3:00pm
 Saturday evening: 5:30pm
 Saturday night: 7:30pm
 Sunday afternoon: 2:00pm (only during AEST)
 Sunday afternoon: 4:05pm
 Sunday evening: 6:30pm (only during AEDT)

On ANZAC Day, two matches are played:

 St. George Illawarra Dragons vs Sydney Roosters: 4:05pm (Sydney Cricket Ground)
 Melbourne Storm vs New Zealand Warriors: 7:50pm (Melbourne Rectangular Stadium)

On Easter Weekend:

 Good Friday — the 6pm match is moved to 4:05pm, where the South Sydney Rabbitohs play the Canterbury-Bankstown Bulldogs in the annual Good Friday Game
 Easter Monday — the Parramatta Eels play the Wests Tigers at 4:05pm in the annual Easter Monday Game

On the Queen's Birthday holiday, the Canterbury-Bankstown Bulldogs play the St. George Illawarra Dragons at 4:05pm in the Queen's Birthday Clash.

History 

The 1908 NSWRFL season featured ten rounds, with each of the nine teams playing nine games each, playing one team twice in the process. The following season, due to the loss of Cumberland, the eight teams played ten rounds, playing ten games in the process (six teams once, two teams twice). The following ten years saw each team play fourteen matches, playing each team in the competition twice. The next eighteen years saw a lot of change in the number of matches played, including years where some teams played a match more than others. In 1938, consistency was again found, where each team played each other team twice, constituting into a 14-round, 14-game season. In 1947, with the additions of Manly Warringah and Parramatta, the number of teams was brought up to ten, meaning that the number of matches was brought up to 18. In 1967, the NSWRL again expanded at the same rate, with Cronulla-Sutherland and Penrith being introduced, making the league a 12 team contest. The same seasonal structure remained, with each team playing each other twice. In 1982, with the additions of the Canberra Raiders and the Illawarra Steelers, the number of teams was brought up to fourteen, increasing the number of games to 26. In 1984, with the loss of the Newtown Jets, one team had a bye each week, however there were still 26 rounds, only with 24 games for each team. In 1988, three teams were added (Brisbane Broncos, Gold Coast-Tweed Giants, Newcastle Knights), leading to the NSWRL changing up the draw formula, with teams playing seven teams twice and eight teams just once in the new 22-game season. In the 1996 ARL season, due to the emergence of the Super League war, teams aligned with the Super League refused to take part in the first week, leading to an unbalanced match count, with twelve teams having 21 games and eight teams having 22. In 1997, the 12 team ARL had each team play each other twice, leading to a 22-game season. The 10 team Super League went with the same style, ending up with an 18-game season. After the two leagues reunified into the National Rugby League, the 1998 NRL season saw the 20 teams play 24 matches, playing five teams twice whilst coming up against the other 14 sides once. The next season, the competition cut to 17 teams, meaning one team had a bye each week. The teams still played 24 matches though, playing more teams twice. In the 2000 season, when the competition again cut to 14, the season expanded the season size so every team played each other twice, leading to a 26-game season. In the 2002 season, 15 teams played 24 matches across 26 weeks, with each team receiving two byes throughout the year. In the 2007 season, with the addition of the Gold Coast Titans, the teams played 24 matches over 25 weeks, receiving one bye each. Round 26 was added back into the season schedule the following year, and remained until 2018, when that round was taken off again. In the 2020 NRL season, due to the COVID-19 pandemic, the season was placed in a two-month hiatus from March to May. The season was then revised into a 20-game campaign with no byes. It also held the competition's first matches behind closed doors.

Currently, seasons are 25 rounds long with 24 matches being played by each club. There is also a representative weekend in May/June, when no clubs play to make way for tests and State of Origin.

References 

National Rugby League